Javier Caceres can refer to:

 Javier Caceres (footballer) (born 1939), Peruvian footballer
 Javier Caceres (sport shooter) (born 1919), Peruvian sport shooter